is a former Japanese football player. He played for Japan national team.

Club career
Noguchi was born in Chiba Prefecture on June 5, 1970. After graduating from high school, he joined Japan Soccer League club Fujita Industries (later Bellmare Hiratsuka) in 1989. Through Japan Football League, the club was promoted to J1 League in 1994. The club won the champions 1994 Emperor's Cup. In Asia, the club also won 1995 Asian Cup Winners' Cup. Although he played as regular player for long time, his opportunity to play decreased in 1997. In 1997, he moved to Japan Football League club Kawasaki Frontale. Toward end of his career, he played for Nagoya Grampus Eight (1998-1999) and Omiya Ardija (2000). He retired end of 2000 season.

National team career
On August 6, 1995, Noguchi debuted for Japan national team against Costa Rica.

Club statistics

National team statistics

References

External links

Japan National Football Team Database

1970 births
Living people
Association football people from Chiba Prefecture
Japanese footballers
Japan international footballers
Japan Soccer League players
J1 League players
J2 League players
Japan Football League (1992–1998) players
Shonan Bellmare players
Kawasaki Frontale players
Nagoya Grampus players
Omiya Ardija players
Association football forwards